This is a list of magazines published in Wisconsin:

Fort Atkinson
 Hoard's Dairyman 
 Professional Distributor 
 Professional Tool & Equipment News

Madison
 The Progressive 
 "The Wisconsin Engineer" 
 Wisconsin Magazine of History

Milwaukee
 Birds & Blooms 
 Cabin Life 
 Discover 
 Garden Railways 
 MKE Lifestyle Magazine 
 Milwaukee Home and Fine Living 
 Model Railroader 
 OnMilwaukee.com 
 Reminisce 
 Taste of Home 
 Trains 
 Wisconsin Trails (defunct)
 The Writer

Oshkosh
 Nude & Natural

Other locations
 Astronomy (Waukesha)
 Coins (Iola, Wisconsin) 
 Goldmine 
 Knucklebones (Iola)
 Music K-8 (Wauwatosa) 

Wisconsin
Magazines